Mayurakshi River (also called Mor River) is a major river in Jharkhand and West Bengal, India, with a long history of devastating floods.

It flows through Jharkhand and then through the districts of Birbhum and Murshidabad in West Bengal before flowing into the Hooghly River.

Mayurakshi literally means "peacock eyes" (mayur/mor=peacock, akshi=eye). The comparison is with the beautiful feathers on a peacock's tail. Mayurakshi though named after its crystal clear water of the dry seasons, floods its valley during the monsoons. Even after the construction of the Massanjore dam, it wreaks havoc with its floods, washing away embankments.

Floods and their control
Many of the rivers that originate on the Chota Nagpur Plateau, including the Mayurakshi, and flow down into West Bengal are rain fed and have for ages wrought havoc with their seasonal floods.

Some of the historically important floods in this river were recorded by L.S.S. O'Malley in the Bengal District Gazetteers for the districts of Murshidabad and Birbhum. For the district of Birbhum, O'Malley has noted "in 1787 there was a high flood which it is said, in some places swept off villages, inhabitants and cattle, the crops on the ground, with everything that was moveable." O'Malley also recorded that "in 1806 the Mayurakshi and Ajay had a sudden extraordinary rise and floods washed away whole villages." In September 1902, because of heavy rains the Brahmani and the Mayurakshi overflowed their banks and inundated the surrounding country in some places to the depth of

Massanjore Dam

From the counterpart rupee fund created through supplies of wheat and other materials from Canada for use in India, Canada devoted those rupees to the further development of the Mayurakshi dam project. The Massanjore dam (also called Canada Dam), across the Mayurakshi, was commissioned in 1955. It was formally inaugurated by Lester B. Pearson, Foreign Minister of Canada. Unfortunately, the Massanjore dam located near Dumka in the state of Jharkhand (erstwhile Bihar) was not allowed to have any flood reserve. Simultaneously with construction of dams the state government in 1956, selectively took over flood control embankments till then maintained by the landlords or local bodies. It had cost Rs. 16.10 crore.

Tilpara Barrage

Since 1960
After major floods in 1978, West Bengal suffered consecutively in 1998, 1999 and 2000. In 1978, seventy two hours of continuous and concentrated rainfall over the western river basin areas of the Bhagirathi viz. from the Pagla-Bansloi to the Ajay, generated so huge flood volume that all embankments on the eastern side of the Bhagirathi were almost washed away and the whole of Nadia district, a larger part of Murshidabad district and northern areas of North 24 Parganas district were flooded and remained underwater for a long time. Construction of embankments is the only structural measure available for the provision of relief to the people. Major embankments line long stretches of such rivers as Mayurakshi, Dwarka, Brahmani and Ajay

Irrigation and power

Tributaries
The Mayurakshi is fed by tributaries Brahmani, Dwaraka, Bakreshwar and Kopai.

References

External links
 Tilpara satellite view  –  Mayurakshi river is against the blue arrow - by moving the map, almost the entire course of the river can be traced.

Rivers of Jharkhand
Rivers of West Bengal
Rivers of India